The City Hall is a historical building in Cologne, western Germany. It is located off Hohe Straße in the district of Innenstadt, and set between the two squares of Rathausplatz and Alter Markt. It houses part of the city government, including the city council and offices of the Lord Mayor. It is Germany's oldest city hall with a documented history spanning some 900 years. The history of its council during the 11th century is a prominent example for self-gained municipal autonomy of Medieval cities.

Today's building complex consists of several structures, added successively in varying architectural styles: they include the 14th century historic town hall, the 15th century Gothic style tower, the 16th century Renaissance style loggia and cloister (the Löwenhof), and the 20th century Modern Movement atrium (the Piazzetta). The so-called Spanischer Bau is an extension on Rathausplatz but not directly connected with the main building.

History 

 
The City Hall is located on the site of the former Ancient Roman Praetorium, which until the year 475 was seat of the Roman Governor of Germania Inferior. Merovingian kings are known to have used the praetorium as a regia until 754, however the building was ultimately destroyed by an earthquake in the late 8th century. Under Hildebold of Cologne, the city was elevated from a bishop's to an archbishop's see in 795, and the area around the former praetorium has become home to both a group of wealthy Patrician merchants and Cologne's Jewish community, many of whom were under immunity granted by the king.

With Emperor Otto I's younger brother Bruno the Great becoming archbishop in 953, the Ottonian dynasty established a secular government by an ecclesiastic archbishop. This abundance of power in Medieval Europe was in stark confrontation to the emerge of emancipating burghers: armed conflicts in 1074 and 1096 were followed by the formation of a commune and first municipal structures as a basis for urban autonomy. In order to consolidate their economic and political rights, Cologne burghers established fraternities and trade guilds (most notably the Richerzeche). In the 1106 war of succession between Emperor Henry V and his father Emperor Henry IV, they took deliberate opposition to the archbishop, after which they gained benefit in regards to the city's territorial expansion over the following years. As – at the time – one of Europe's busiests trading ports and largest city in Germany, the population of Cologne gradually changed from a mainly feudal society to free citizens. Documents from the years 1135 and 1152, recorded "a house in which citizen convene", referring to the first established council hall, at the location of today's town hall. The coat of arms of Cologne, first mentioned in 1114, is Europe's oldest municipal coat of arms.

By 1180, the citizens of Cologne won a legal battle against Philip I, Archbishop of Cologne, for another extension of Cologne's city walls. With the Battle of Worringen fought in 1288, Cologne became independent from the Electorate and on 9th September 1475 officially gained Imperial immediacy as a free imperial city. In 1388 Pope Urban VI signed the charter for the University of Cologne, Europe's first university to have been established by citizenry. On 14th September 1396 the constitution of Cologne came into effect and the Cologne gaffs and guilds (Gaffeln and Zünfte) assumed power in the council. Following the tradition of Roman consuls, the council was headed by two elected Burgomasters (Mayors) until the year 1797, when council and constitution were replaced by the Napoleonic and later code civil. Since 1815 the city council is led by one Oberbürgermeister (Lord Mayor).

During the bombing the entire city hall was destroyed except for the front portion and part of the tower, the remaining part being rebuilt in modern style.

Buildings and building components

Historic Town Hall 

The oldest part of today's City Hall is the so-called Saalbau (i.e. roofed hall building), which replaced a previous Romanesque style council building of 1135 on the same location. The Saalbau dates back to 1330 and is named after the Hansasaal, a 30,0 by 7,6 metres large and up to 9,58 metres tall assembly hall and core of the entire Rathaus. The hall is named after the Hanseatic League, which held an important summit in it on 19. November 1367. Noteworthy are stone figures of the Nine Worthies, the Emperor and the Privileges.

Tower 

Commissioned by the Cologne guilds on 19 August 1406, the Gothic-style Ratsturm (Council tower) was built between 1407 and 1414 and reaches a height of 61 metres. It consists of five storeys and the so-called Ratskeller (Council cellar). Its purpose was mainly to store documents, but one of the lower floors also housed the Senatssaal (i.e. hall of the Cologne Senate). While being heavily damaged during the bombing of Cologne in World War II, the tower – including the many exterior stone figures – has been restored entirely. Curiously, beneath the statue of Konrad von Hochstaden, there is a grotesque male character performing autofellatio. Four times daily, a carillon (German: Glockenspiel) is played by the tower's bells.

Loggia 
The Rathauslaube – as the Renaissance style Loggia is called – is a replacement of a previous loggia on the same location. The council initiated a lengthy design process in 1557, which lasted until 1562. In July 1567 the council approved the design by Wilhelm Vernukken from Kalkar to be built, with construction lasting from 1569 to 1573. The loggia consists of a 2-storey, five-bay long and two-bay deep arcade, which functions as entrance to the councils main hall (Hansasaal) at ground level, and as balcony for the main hall on the upper floor. The balcony was used for public speeches throughout the year.

Piazzetta 

Likened to a small piazza with various building making up the perimeter walls, the 900 square metre large and 12.6 metres tall atrium was built during the postwar restoration of the historic town hall.

Spanischer Bau 
Built on the North-western side of Rathausplatz in the years 1608 to 1615, the city council commissioned the originally Dutch Renaissance style building for meetings and celebrations. The name emerged in reference to Spanish delegates at the building during the time of the Thirty Years' War (1618–1648). However it was not in official use before the 19th century. After having been heavily damaged in 1942, the building was completely rebuilt in 1953.

See also 
 
 Mayor of Cologne
 History of Cologne
 Historical Archive of the City of Cologne
 Rathaus (disambiguation)

References

External links 
 
 City of Cologne: Description of the history and architecture of the building 
 Cologne Tourism: Historic Town Hall 

 

City Hall
City and town halls in Germany
12th century in the Holy Roman Empire
1130s establishments in the Holy Roman Empire
1135 establishments in Europe
Innenstadt, Cologne
Government of Cologne
Renaissance architecture in Germany
History of Cologne
Loggias